Pick-up sticks, pick-a-stick, jackstraws, jack straws, spillikins, spellicans, or fiddlesticks is a game of physical and mental skill in which a bundle of sticks, between 8 and 20 centimeters long, is dropped as a loose bunch onto a table top into a random pile. Each player, in turn, tries to remove a stick from the pile without disturbing any of the others. The object of the game is to pick up the most sticks or to score the most points based on the color of the sticks.

The game is believed to have developed from the yarrow stalks used for divination with the Chinese I Ching. It was first published in Germany about 1850. The sticks may be made of almost any material, such as ivory, bone, wood, bamboo, straw, reed, rush, yarrow, or plastics. Some Haida First Nation pick-up sticks are plain maple wood decorated with abalone shell and copper.

Today, the most common pick-up sticks game is Mikado. It remains difficult in all variations.

Play 
There are different versions of the game. Typically, there are 30 or more sticks and at least two players. At the beginning of game play, the bundle of sticks is randomly distributed or dropped so the sticks end up in a tangled pile. The more tangled the pile, the more challenging the game. In some versions of the game any sticks not touching at least one other stick are removed. The first player (sometimes the youngest) attempts to remove a single stick at a time, without moving any other stick. If the player succeeds, that player's turn continues. If a player moves another stick, the turn immediately passes clockwise to the next player.

In some versions of the game, the next player can opt to begin a turn by asking the player after that to pick up all the sticks and randomly remake the pile.

In some versions of the game, players may use only their fingers to move the desired stick. In other versions, players may use a tool to move one stick away from the pile; this tool may be one of the sticks, held aside before the game begins, or a particular colored stick, typically black, that may be won by a player who successfully moves it.

The object of the game is for a player to pick up more sticks than picked up by any other players. In more complex games, different-colored sticks are worth different numbers of points, and the winner is the person with the highest score.

Variants

Mikado 

The game is named for the highest-scoring (blue) stick, the "Mikado" (Emperor of Japan).

Mikado Scoring

Farm Tools 

The pieces in a Farm tools set are related to farmyard tools, such as ladders, rakes, shovels, and hoes. Typically, around 45 pieces are in a set, made of wood, plastic, bone, or ivory. In addition to the tools, typically a helper piece with a hooked end is included for use in snagging and manipulating pieces. Each piece has a point value, with more challenging pieces being worth more points.

Farm Tools Scoring

See also 
 Jenga
 Jonchets
 Blockhead!

Children's games
Tabletop games